Denticulate ligaments (also known as dentate ligaments) are lateral projections of the spinal pia mater forming triangular-shaped ligaments that anchor the spinal cord along its length to the dura mater on each side. There are usually 21 denticulate ligaments on each side, with the uppermost pair occurring just below the foramen magnum, and the lowest pair occurring between spinal nerve roots of T12 and L1. The denticulate ligaments are traditionally believed to provide stability for the spinal cord against motion within the vertebral column.

Their tooth-like appearance originates the word which derives from Latin denticulatus, from denticulus (meaning ‘small tooth’).

Anatomy
The bases of denticulate ligaments arise in the pia mater and are firmly attached to the arachnoid mater and dura mater at the apex. The denticulate ligaments extend across the subarachnoid space between anterior nerve roots and posterior nerve roots, piercing the intervening spinal arachnoid mater to reach the dura.

Structure 
Each denticulate ligament is composed of a single narrow fibrous strip that extends from the craniovertebral junction to T12. Each ligament features 18-20 triangular extensions that attach to the dura at their apices in between successive nerve roots. The triangular extensions are smaller and more numerous at the cervical levels, and are larger and less numerous at the thoracic levels.

These ligaments may be affected by altered motion and position of the vertebral segments.

Microanatomy/histology 
The narrow fibrous strip of the denticulate ligament features longitudinally oriented collagen fibers, whereas the triangular extensions are composed of transverse and obliquely oriented collagen fibers. The collagen fibers are thicker and more abundant at the cervical than at the thoracic levels.

Biomechanics 
Denticulate ligaments are characterised by high extensibility (on average 50% of their initial length) and relatively low force necessary to rupture them (around 1 N). Their strength, especially in cervical region, decreases in caudal orientation.

Clinical significance 
From a clinical standpoint, denticulate ligaments do not play a significant role in lumbar spinal stenosis when compared to issues such as disc herniations, facet hypertrophy, shape of spinal canal, size of spinal canal, ligamentum flavum hypertrophy, or degenerative joint disease resulting in bony osteophyte formation.

Additional images

Sources

Clinically Oriented Anatomy. Moore, Keith and Arthur F. Dalley. Philadelphia, Lippincott Williams & Wilkins 2006.

See also

 Filum terminale

References

External links
  - "Coverings of the spinal cord."

Ligaments
Meninges